Glenbard South High School (GSHS) is a public four-year high school located in Glen Ellyn, Illinois, United States. It is part of Glenbard Township High School District 87, and is the smallest of the four Glenbard Township High Schools. It contains students within the boundary of Community Consolidated School District 89.

History
Glenbard South was the fourth of the Glenbard high schools built. It opened in 1972. The capacity of the building is 1500, but with additions, could actually house 2500 students.

Academics
In 2021, Glenbard South had an average composite SAT score of 1054.5, and graduated 95.1% of its senior class.

Glenbard South has made Adequate Yearly Progress on the Prairie State Achievements Examination, a state test part of the No Child Left Behind Act.

The staff includes approximately 112 teachers, of whom 91.5% hold an advanced degree.

Athletics

Glenbard South was a charter member of the Western Sun Conference, but when that conference dissolved in 2010, GSHS became an independent school.  Glenbard South joined the Metro Suburban Conference for the 2011–12 school year, but left the conference to join the Upstate Eight Conference in 2018.

The boys' cross-country team won the Class AA Illinois state championship in 2001–02.

In 2012 and 2013, the girls' softball team won state.

In 2007, the boys' track and field 4X800m relay team won the Nike Outdoor Nationals competition with a time of 7:40.57.

Activities
The Math Team took first place in the state of Illinois among schools with 1,000 to 1,999 students in 2006.
The Mock Trial team won state at the ISBA High School Mock Trial Invitational in 1985, 1986, 1992, 1993, and 1997.
The Glenbard South Symphonic Band won the 2007 Illinois Superstate Concert Band Festival in the Class AA Division. The previous time the band won was in 1992.
In 2010, the Glenbard South Chess Team finished high enough at the IHSA State Chess Tournament to win the Illinois Chess Coaches Association's State Championship in the 3A division.

Notable alumni
 Greg Bloedorn (1991), former NFL long snapper for the Seattle Seahawks
 Tim Costo (1987), former Major League Baseball player (1992–93), playing his entire career for the Cincinnati Reds
 Jason Karnuth (1994), former Major League Baseball relief pitcher
 Ryan McPartlin (1993), actor primarily known for his work on television (Captain Awesome on Chuck)
 Lamorne Morris (2001), actor, New Girl
 Eboo Patel, former member of the Obama Administration's Faith Advisory Council and founder; current executive director of the Interfaith Youth Core
 Qasim Rashid, author of The Wrong Kind of Muslim
 Carter Reum, author, entrepreneur, and venture capitalist; married to socialite Paris Hilton
 Courtney Reum, author, entrepreneur, and venture capitalist; co-founder of the investment firm M13 with his brother Carter Reum 
 Nikos Tselios (1997), former NHL defenseman for the Carolina Hurricanes (2001–02)

References

External links 
 Glenbard South High School website

Public high schools in Illinois
Glen Ellyn, Illinois
Educational institutions established in 1972
Schools in DuPage County, Illinois